Rudolf I ( – 3/4 July 1307), also known as Rudolf of Habsburg, was a member of the House of Habsburg, the King of Bohemia and titular King of Poland from 1306 until his death. He was also Duke of Austria and Styria from 1298.

Early life 
Rudolf was the eldest son of Duke Albert I of Austria and his wife Elizabeth of Gorizia-Tyrol, thereby the grandson of King Rudolf I of Germany. After lengthy struggles with Adolf of Nassau, his father was elected King of Germany in 1298 and vested sixteen-year-old Rudolf as a co-ruler with the Austrian hereditary lands of the Habsburg dynasty. According to the Treaty of Rheinfelden, Rudolf acted as regent on behalf of his younger brothers Frederick the Fair and Leopold I.

On 25 May 1300 King Albert I arranged his marriage with Blanche, a daughter of King Philip III of France. The intended union failed as the couple's son and daughter died young and Blanche herself died, probably after a miscarriage, in 1305. Rudolf accompanied his father on his 1304 expedition against King Wenceslaus II of Bohemia, who had placed his son Wenceslaus III on the Hungarian throne after the Árpád dynasty died out in 1301 with the death of King Andrew III.

King of Bohemia
Another opportunity for a Habsburg gain in power opened when in 1306 King Wenceslaus III, the last Bohemian ruler of the Přemyslid dynasty, was killed and Albert I was able to seize his kingdom as an escheated fief. Rudolph was then vested with the Bohemian throne. This was contested by his maternal uncle Duke Henry of Carinthia, husband of Wenceslaus' sister Anne. When several Bohemian nobles elected Henry King of Bohemia, Albert I placed his brother-in-law under the Imperial ban and marched against Prague. Henry fled, first to Bavaria, then back to his Carinthian homelands. To further legitimate the Habsburg claims to the Bohemian and the Polish throne, Albert had Rudolph married to Elizabeth Richeza of Poland, widow of King Wenceslaus II.

Mocked as král kaše ("king porridge") for his thriftiness rather than stomach problems, Rudolf was rejected by several Bohemian nobles, who continued to hold out for Henry. His aims to take hold of the silver deposits at Kutná Hora (Kuttenberg) sparked a rebellion led by the noble House of Strakonice. The king besieged the rebel fortress of Horažďovice, but died at the campsite in the night of 3 to 4 July 1307, probably of gastrointestinal perforation.

As Rudolf left no children, the first grab of the Habsburgs for the Crown of Saint Wenceslas failed when the Bohemian nobles restored Henry as king in return for a charter of privileges, who in turn had to renounce the throne in favour of Count John of Luxembourg three years later. Instead Rudolph's enfeoffment intensified the inner Habsburg inheritance conflict, culminating in the assassination of King Albert I by his nephew John Parricida in 1308. Rudolph is buried at the St. Vitus Cathedral in Prague.

References

Sources

External links

Rudolph 1 of Bohemia
Rudolph 1 of Bohemia
13th-century dukes of Austria
14th-century dukes of Austria
13th-century House of Habsburg
14th-century House of Habsburg
Roman Catholic monarchs
Habsburg kings of Bohemia
Rudolph 1 of Bohemia
Rudolph 1 of Bohemia
Burials at St. Vitus Cathedral
14th-century monarchs in Europe